Amanda Knight is a make-up artist.

On January 24, 2012, she was nominated for an Academy Award for the movie Harry Potter and the Deathly Hallows – Part 2. This was at the 84th Academy Awards in the category of Best Makeup. She shared her nomination with Nick Dudman and Lisa Tomblin.

References

External links

Make-up artists
Living people
1966 births